Sinorice Travonce Moss (born December 28, 1983) is a former American football wide receiver in the National Football League (NFL) and Canadian Football League (CFL). He was drafted by the New York Giants in the second round of the 2006 NFL Draft. He also played in the CFL for the Saskatchewan Roughriders. Moss played college football at the University of Miami.

Moss's older brother, Santana, is a former wide receiver who played in the NFL for 14 seasons as a member of the New York Jets and Washington Redskins.  His younger cousin, Zack Moss, is currently a running back for the Indianapolis Colts.

College career
Moss played college football for the University of Miami Hurricanes, where he was a standout wide receiver. Before being drafted in the 2nd round of the 2006 NFL Draft by the New York Giants, Moss was rewarded MVP of the 2006 Senior Bowl.

Moss was also a track star at the University of Miami, where he recorded personal bests of 6.42 seconds in the 55 meters and 10.50 seconds in the 100 meters.

Personal bests

Professional career

New York Giants
Moss was selected by the New York Giants with the 44th overall pick in the second round of the 2006 NFL Draft out of the University of Miami.

The Giants expected to groom Moss to be their slot receiver in 2006 but his progress was marred by a recurring quadriceps injury, which caused him to miss training camp and limited him to five receptions during his rookie season in six games.  In 2007, Moss played in 13 games, the year of Giants' Super Bowl XLII victory.

After two seasons with the Giants that produced only 26 receptions for 230 yards and no touchdowns, Moss vowed to improve in the 2008 campaign. However, Mario Manningham and Hakeem Nicks, quickly surpassed Moss on the depth chart.

Prior to the 2010 season, Domenik Hixon, who had taken the return job away from Moss during the 2009 season, tore his ACL and was placed on injured reserve. During the preseason, Moss competed for the return specialist job, but suffered from a sports hernia and on August 31, 2010 was placed on season-ending injured reserve. Moss was officially waived by the Giants on November 9, 2010 after reaching an injury settlement. Primarily because of injuries, he departed New York after a five-year career that included just three touchdowns.

Philadelphia Eagles
Moss was signed by the Philadelphia Eagles to a future contract on January 10, 2011. He was released on September 3 during final roster cuts.

Saskatchewan Roughriders
On April 24, 2012, Moss was signed by the Saskatchewan Roughriders. After playing in only two regular season games, Moss was released during the following off-season on March 8, 2013.

Personal life
Since retiring from football, Moss has quietly begun pursuing a career as an actor. He has one son, Sinorice Moss Jr.

References

External links

Philadelphia Eagles bio

1983 births
Living people
American football wide receivers
Miami Hurricanes football players
New York Giants players
Saskatchewan Roughriders players
Miami Carol City Senior High School alumni
Philadelphia Eagles players
Players of American football from Miami
Players of Canadian football from Miami